Avion Presidente Juarez was the Mexican presidential airplane.

History 
This presidential aircraft is considered the best in Latin America. The plane is certified to fly by instruments under any weather conditions, has a range of nearly eleven hours of flight and can travel six thousand miles per tank at cruising speed. Inside, the Benito Juarez has room for 66 passengers and 15 crew members. At the center of the ship there is an area reserved for the President, which includes an office, bedroom and bathroom. In addition, due to spending enough time in hangar-unlike, for example, the Air Force of Argentina and Chile, which are open-parked, weather-related damage to this particular plane is relatively minimal. However, it has not been without incident. On February 8, 2008, Benito Juárez staggered before landing in Newark, New Jersey, so the pilot had to balance the plane to prevent from proceeding to the grasslands of the Newark airport.

Previous planes
 El Mexicano The Mexican
 Francisco Zarco
 El Ciudad de México The Mexico City
 El Tenochtitlán, El Guanajuato, El Jalisco, El Puebla
 Miguel Hidalgo (a.k.a. El Topo Gigio)
 Quetzalcoatl I and Quetzalcoatl II

Sections 
It has two sections. The first section is called the VIP section, and the second section is the regular section. On the first section the president, special guests and the leader of the Estado Mayor Presidencial travel; journalists and military personnel travel in the second section.

Other aircraft 
The Mexican president also uses smaller airplanes for local trips. Some such as a Gulfstream III. Other airplanes used are Learjet 36A, Learjet 35A and Rockwell Turbocommander 695A. Helicopters are also used such as Eurocopter Super Puma and Puma.

This is a list of all presidential aircraft in 2010
The current presidential fleet as of 2010 is as follows:

See also
Air Force One
Air transports of heads of state and government
Russian presidential aircraft - Official aircraft of the President of Russia

External links
 Official Page of Mexico's President (in Spanish)Presidential Air Float Official Site (in Spanish)

References

Boeing aircraft
Presidential aircraft
Vehicles of Mexico